Lancaster is a village in Erie County, New York, United States. As of the 2010 census, the village population was 10,352. It is part of the Buffalo–Niagara Falls Metropolitan Statistical Area.

The village of Lancaster is in the west part of the town of Lancaster and is east of Buffalo.

The Lancaster Opera House is locally famous for its musicals and stage plays. The current mayor is Lynne T. Ruda.

History 

The Village of Lancaster was incorporated in 1849 from part of the town of Lancaster. Lancaster is the third oldest incorporated village in Erie County, behind Springville and Gowanda. The village is proud of its historic past and emphasizes preservation of its historic buildings. Lancaster was formerly known as "Cayuga Creek". Lancaster is one of approximately 30 communities in New York with historic districts.

The oldest house in the village is the Carpenter–Draper House, built in 1831. The Lancaster Presbyterian Church is the second oldest religious structure in Erie County, built in 1832.

Churches in the village include Lancaster Presbyterian Church, St. John's Lutheran, Trinity Episcopal, and Faith United Methodist. Catholic churches include St. Mary of the Assumption and Our Lady of Pompeii.

In 1894 the Lancaster Opera House was built. This building is still the main focus of the downtown Lancaster area because of its massive size and its clock tower. Lancaster Town offices are located in the building. This leads people to call the building both the Opera House and Town Hall.

The Central Avenue/Broadway area is the downtown business area in the village. The former West Main Street was at one time another major business street in the downtown area. However, today very few businesses are located on the street due to its demolition in the early 1970s. In the near future, West Main will be re-extended all the way to the intersection of Aurora, North Aurora, and St. Mary's streets, as it had before the demolition.

Four railroads (Erie RR, Lehigh Valley RR, Delaware, Lackawanna and Western RR, and New York Central RR) once traversed the village, but only two remain. The fifth railroad in the town of Lancaster, the West Shore RR, did not go through the village, but did have a station in Bowmansville, a hamlet in the northwestern part of the town. Each railroad had a station on Central Ave.

A trolley once went through the village, down Como Park Boulevard from Buffalo, to Lake Avenue, to Church Street, to East Main Street (now Broadway), to Central Avenue, and then finally to Sawyer Avenue. The trolley then continued into the connecting village of Depew, where Sawyer Avenue turned into Main Street.

Several fires have caused damage over the years to the downtown area. The Great Fire of 1894 destroyed much of the west side of Central Avenue and the Grimes-Davis Mansion, which stood at the corner of Broadway and Central Avenue. A gas station now occupies the site.

The village includes part of Como Lake Park, owned and operated by Erie County

Church Street, a street off Broadway, contains many architecturally significant homes.

Lancaster's first immigrants were Dutch. Germans came in the mid-1800s, who founded St. Mary of the Assumption Catholic Church. Italian immigrants were the last to populate the village area. They founded Our Lady of Pompeii Catholic Church.

St. John Neumann was a circuit priest in the mid-1800s around the Buffalo area. St. Mary of the Assumption Church (St. Mary's on the Hill) was one of his stops. He celebrated mass there once a month. St. John Neumann played a big part in the building of the church and school.

Geography
Lancaster is located at  (42.900408, −78.67303), on Cayuga Creek and U.S. Route 20 (Broadway). The village's northern boundary is Walden Avenue, the eastern edge is Walter Winter Road, and the southern edge is the northern boundary of the former Buffalo Creek Indian Reservation. The western boundary is a former farm-lot line which is now Brunswick Road.

Historic buildings
The following structures are listed on the National Register of Historic Places listings in Erie County, New York: Bruce-Briggs Brick Block, DePew Lodge No. 823, Free and Accepted Masons, Clark-Lester House, John Richardson House, Lancaster Municipal Building, Liebler-Rohl Gasoline Station, Miller-Mackey House, Dr. John J. Nowak House, John P. Sommers House, US Post Office-Lancaster, Herman B. VanPeyma House, and Zuidema-Idsardi House.

Points of interest 
Central Avenue in the downtown area is the busiest street in the village, along with Broadway. The downtown area contains shops and boutiques. See Central Avenue Historic District.

Como Lake Park in the village is a place to congregate. The lighthouse in Como Lake Park on Cayuga Creek is a place for people of many ages to gather.

Broadway has many large houses and mansions that are architecturally significant. Many of these houses have been changed into businesses and offices. Broadway also contains many historical Protestant churches. See Broadway Historic District.

St. Mary's Cemetery is a historic cemetery located behind St. Mary of the Assumption Church.

Lancaster Town Hall, also known as the Opera House, is located on Central Avenue.

The Lancaster Municipal Building is located on Broadway. It contains all of the village offices, including one of the two village fire halls. The other fire hall is located on W. Drullard Avenue.

Keysa Park contains a public swimming pool. It is located on Vandenburg Avenue.

Streets in Lancaster 
Many of the streets in Lancaster are very large and wide, complemented with large, old trees. Broadway has the oldest trees, while Burwell and Sawyer avenues are the widest residential streets.

Most of Central Avenue north of Sawyer Avenue and south of Hinchey Avenue is below grade level. The reason for this is that three of the four bridges that carry railroads are very close together. All of the streets coming into Central Avenue must slant downwards toward it. The houses on Central Avenue are above street level. Central Avenue is also very wide.

Many of Lancaster's streets still contain original brick underneath the pavement.

Demographics

As of the census of 2000, there were 11,188 people, 4,726 households, and 2,958 families residing in the village. The population density was 4,155.0 people per square mile (5.8/km2). There were 4,908 housing units at an average density of 1,822.7 per square mile (704.5/km2). The racial makeup of the village was 98.62% White, 0.32% Black or African American, 0.26% Native American, 0.13% Asian, 0.01% Pacific Islander, 0.18% from other races, and 0.47% from two or more races. Hispanic or Latino of any race were 0.81% of the population.

There were 4,726 households, out of which 27.4% had children under the age of 18 living with them, 49.3% were married couples living together, 10.1% had a female householder with no husband present, and 37.4% were non-families. 32.9% of all households were made up of individuals, and 15.5% had someone living alone who was 65 years of age or older. The average household size was 2.34 and the average family size was 2.99.

In the village, the population was spread out, with 22.6% under the age of 18, 7.2% from 18 to 24, 30.2% from 25 to 44, 22.2% from 45 to 64, and 17.8% who were 65 years of age or older. The median age was 39 years. For every 100 females, there were 91.1 males. For every 100 females age 18 and over, there were 85.9 males.

The median income for a household in the village was $40,149, and the median income for a family was $53,514. Males had a median income of $39,772 versus $25,839 for females. The per capita income for the village was $20,308. About 3.1% of families and 5.1% of the population were below the poverty line, including 4.4% of those under age 18 and 8.7% of those age 65 or over.

Major highways
 U.S. Route 20 (Broadway), an east-west highway running through the village and town of Lancaster.
New York State Route 952Q (Walden Ave.), an east-west highway through the village and town of Lancaster. Walden Avenue is the longest non-parkway New York State Reference Route. Walden's reference route number is not signed, but still has reference markers, and is maintained by New York State Department of Transportation (NYSDOT) as other signed routes are.

References

External links
Lancaster village official website
 Lancaster Information

Villages in New York (state)
Buffalo–Niagara Falls metropolitan area
Villages in Erie County, New York